The Western Australia Combined XI was a representative team raised intermittently between the year 1936 and 1990. The team, comprising state cricketers and select players from the Australian national side, played against touring international sides. Matches were played exclusively at the WACA Ground in Perth. In total, nine matches were played – eight first-class, and one List A – with the Combined XI winning three matches, touring sides one match and five ending in a draw.

Fixtures

First-class matches

List A matches

See also
 Tasmania Combined XI

References

Australian first-class cricket teams
Combined XI
Representative sports teams of Western Australia